KXBG (97.9 FM) is a radio station licensed to Cheyenne, Wyoming. Owned by iHeartMedia, it broadcasts a country format targeting the Fort Collins-Greeley, Colorado area. Its studios are located in Loveland, Colorado.

History
The station was assigned the call sign KFBQ-FM on 1978-11-20. On 1996-04-15, it changed to KIGN and on 2002-06-03, to KQLF. On 2007-06-06, the station became KQMY and finally on 2008-01-17, the current KXBG.

KXBG-HD2
On November 13, 2014, KXBG launched an HD2 subchannel simulcast on translator K297AK 107.3 FM in Loveland, which was previously simulcasting Christian station KDNR, and began stunting with Christmas music as "Santa 107.3". On December 26, 2014, the HD2 subchannel flipped to AC as "Sunny 107.3". On December 26, 2015, after stunting with Christmas music as "Santa 107.3", the HD2 subchannel flipped to Christian AC as "Up 107.3". On June 26, 2017, the HD2 subchannel began stunting with Christmas music as "Santa 107.3", which had been used in each of the past three holiday seasons. On June 29, 2017, the HD2 subchannel launched a 90's hits format, branded as "iHeart 90s 107.3", simulcast on translator K297AK 107.3 FM in Loveland, with the first song being "Jump Around" by House of Pain".  On August 11, 2017, the channel was rebranded as "B107.3". On November 3, 2022, the HD2 subchannel began stunting with Christmas music as "Christmas 107.3". The 90's Hits format would return after Christmas on December 26th.

References

External links

XBG
Country radio stations in the United States
Radio stations established in 1968
1968 establishments in Wyoming
IHeartMedia radio stations